The 1924 United States presidential election in Kansas was held on November 4, 1924 as part of the 1924 United States presidential election. State voters chose ten electors to the Electoral College, who voted for president and vice president.

Background
A rapid recovery from the depression of 1920 and 1921, despite major Republican losses during the 1922 House elections placed the Republican Party – who gained a record popular-vote majority in the 1920 election – in a secure position despite the death of President Warren G. Harding in 1923. Rises in wages and ebbing of discontent further solidified the GOP's hold on power.

More critically, the Democratic Party was mortally divided between its rural Southern faction led by William Gibbs McAdoo and its white ethnic urban northeastern faction led by New York Governor Al Smith. The rural faction was supported by the revived Ku Klux Klan and was in favour of Prohibition, whereas the white ethnic faction was firmly against the anti-Catholic Klan and opposed to Prohibition. A fierce debate ensued that saw a compromise candidate, former Congressman John W. Davis of West Virginia, nominated after one hundred and three ballots in hot summer weather at Madison Square Garden. Although West Virginia was a border state whose limited African-American population had not been disenfranchised as happened in all former Confederate States, Davis did share the extreme social conservatism of Southern Democrats of his era. He supported poll taxes, opposed women's suffrage, and believed in strictly limited government with no expansion in nonmilitary fields.

The conservatism of Coolidge and Davis made it inevitable that aging Wisconsin maverick Robert M. La Follette, Sr. would mount a third-party challenge – which La Follette had planned even before the Democratic Convention. La Follette was formally nominated on July 4 by the "Conference for Progressive Political Action" and developed a platform dedicated to eliminating child labor and American interference in Latin American political affairs, along with a formal denunciation of the Ku Klux Klan. La Follette also proposed major judicial reforms including amendments allowing congress to override judicial review and to re-enact laws declared unconstitutional. La Follette also called for election of federal judges for ten-year terms.

Despite problems in the state's large agricultural sector, La Follette did not have the appeal in Kansas he had in more northerly areas of the Midwest, as isolationism was much weaker in this largely Anglo-Saxon Protestant state and Bryan-era pietist Democratic support struck a different cultural vein from La Follette's largely Catholic and Lutheran backers. Unlike the Bryanites, La Follette's base strongly opposed the Ku Klux Klan, which was widely popular in Kansas, and was focused on farm cooperatives.

Vote
Kansas was won decisively by the Republican Party candidate, incumbent President Calvin Coolidge with 61.54% of the popular vote. The Democratic Party candidate, John W. Davis, garnered only 23.60% of the popular vote. La Follette, listed as an “Independent” on the Kansas ballot was not as successful as in the more northerly Plains States due to Kansas being largely devoid of the German- and Scandinavian-Americans who were his primary support base. The Wisconsin Senator did not crack a third of the vote in any county, and Coolidge replicated Harding and Theodore Roosevelt in sweeping all 105 Kansas counties.

As of 2020, this remains the last time that Kansas voted for a different candidate than neighboring Oklahoma.

Full results

Results by county

See also
 United States presidential elections in Kansas

Notes

References

1924
Kansas
1924 Kansas elections